Chronos Twins is an action-adventure game developed by Spanish studio EnjoyUP Games, released in Europe on October 12, 2007. It was also released in North America on January 18, 2010 and in Europe on May 14, 2010 as a download for the Nintendo DSi system. The game puts a different perspective on time travel than most games. Instead of revisiting an area in two different times, both screens show the same setting during two eras as gamers explore the land with a present-day hero. Chronos Twins was originally planned for release for Game Boy Advance, but after the rise of the Nintendo DS, the game's development switched to that system. An enhanced version for the Wii console entitled Chronos Twins DX was released in North America as a WiiWare download one week prior to the Nintendo DSi release.  It was later released in the PAL region for WiiWare on April 2, 2010.

Story
The player takes on the role of Nec, a member of the Llhedar species, who, because of their psychic abilities and the fact that they never give up until the goal is complete, are well suited for missions such as those in this game. The primary mission of the game is to free the planet Skyla from an alien invasion and the powerful entity known as "Twime." Little is known about Twime; she seems indestructible because of her ability to exist simultaneously in two different times. The player is able to teletransport between the two times by using the "Dual Time," a machine created by the sages of Skyla, the Wise. A secondary objective of the game is to avenge the main character's brother, Nash.

References

External links
 Official website
 Developer website
 Publisher's page for Chronos Twin
 Eurogamer site
 GameSpot page

2007 video games
Alien invasions in video games
Cancelled Game Boy Advance games
DSiWare games
Nintendo DS games
Side-scrolling video games
Video games about time travel
Video games developed in Spain
Video games with 2.5D graphics
WiiWare games
Oxygen Games games
Single-player video games